The Kievsky Yogan (Selkup: Ки́евскэл кыге́) is a river in Tomsk Oblast, Russia.

The Kievsky Yogan flows across the Central Siberian Plateau. Its basin is located in the Alexandrovsky District. There are no permanent settlements along the course of the river.

Course 
The Kievsky Yogan is a right tributary of the Ob river. It flows in a roughly SSW direction along a very swampy area. In its lower reaches there are numerous lakes. Finally it meets an arm of the Ob, the Kiev Channel (проток Киевская),  from its mouth in the right bank of the Ob.

Tributaries  
The river is fed by snow and rain.

See also
List of rivers of Russia

References

External links
Большие реки России (Great Rivers of Russia)
Rivers of Tomsk Oblast]
Central Siberian Plateau